"Time to Get Alone" is a song by the American rock band the Beach Boys from their 1969 album 20/20. Written by Brian Wilson and produced by Carl Wilson, it is a baroque pop waltz. Brian originally intended the song for Redwood, the band that evolved into Three Dog Night.

Recording 
Brian Wilson originally planned to give the song (along with "Darlin'") to Redwood. The group began recording on October 12, 1967 while in the midst of sessions for the Beach Boys' Wild Honey (1967). Strings and horns overdubs were added on October 14 with drums and percussion on October 15. Danny Hutton recounted:

After one vocal session, Brian exited the booth and called up his astrologer, who told him that he was on a "down cycle". Brian, who had an aversion to Los Angeles smog, fled the studio and returned the next day with an oxygen tank and mask, taking hits from the tank and sprinting in the alley behind the studio.

The song was finished by the Beach Boys around a year later in 1968 on October 2, October 4, and November 21 at Brian Wilson's home studio with the October 4 session being captured on film. Portions of the footage was later used for an "I Can Hear Music" promotional video. The group’s vocals were recorded at these sessions, along with the vibraphone, glockenspiel, and an additional piano part.

Reception
PopMatters calls the song "a dream, right on down the line from Carl’s feathery lead vocal—and the way it contrasts with the up-and-down crunch of the waltz backdrop—to the sumptuously layered arrangement of the chorus to the immaculate production job to the unadorned coda (which is from the extended version)."

Personnel
Sourced from Craig Slowinski.

The Beach Boys
 Carl Wilson – vocals
 Al Jardine – vocals
 Mike Love - vocals
 Brian Wilson – vocals, piano, harpsichord, organ

Guests
 Danny Hutton – piano
 Diane Rovell – additional vocals
 Marilyn Wilson – additional vocals

Session musicians
 Ron Brown – bass
 Jay Migliori – flute, clarinet
 Ray Pohlman – bass
 Gene Pello – drums, percussion

Cover versions

 1993 – Three Dog Night, Celebrate: The Three Dog Night Story, 1965–1975

References

External links
 
 
 
 
 
 
 

1969 songs
Baroque pop songs
The Beach Boys songs
Songs written by Brian Wilson
Song recordings produced by the Beach Boys